John Francis Dovidio is the Carl Iver Hovland Professor Emeritus of Psychology and Public Health at Yale University, where he is also the former director of the Intergroup Relations Lab. He is known for his research on the concept of aversive racism and on reducing people's intergroup biases. He was the president of the Society for the Psychological Study of Social Issues from 1999 to 2000. He served as the editor-in-chief of the Personality and Social Psychology Bulletin from 1994 to 1997, of the Journal of Personality and Social Psychologys Interpersonal Relations and Group Processes section from 2002 to 2008, and the co-editor of Social Issues and Policy Review from 2006 to 2011. In 2011, he received the Donald T. Campbell Award from the Society for Personality and Social Psychology, and in 2014, he received the Society's Award for Distinguished Service.

References

External links
Faculty page

Living people
American social psychologists
Dartmouth College alumni
University of Delaware alumni
Yale University faculty
Racism researchers
Psychology journal editors
Year of birth missing (living people)